A tepukei, tepuke or TePuke is a Polynesian boat type, characterized by its elaborate decking, its submerged hulls and symmetrical "crab claw" sail slender foil or radically extended tips claw sail (Te Laa). Tepukei boats are produced primarily by the Polynesian-speaking inhabitants of Taumako (Duff Islands), and have been occasionally borrowed by other Polynesian and Melanesian societies.

Name
The word comes from the phrase te puke  in Vaeakau-Taumako and other Polynesian languages. Removing the noun article te, the original meaning of puke , as reconstructed for the ancestor Proto-Polynesian is “bow and stern decking on a canoe”. By metonymy, the name of that deck has become used for the ship as a whole. (The Proto-Polynesian root for “boat” or “canoe” is *waka.)

History
The tepukei was first reported in print by Spanish explorer Álvaro de Mendaña in 1595, on his visit to the Santa Cruz Islands.

A tepukei looks like an outrigger canoe with a crab claw sail, and is a very sophisticated ocean-going sailing ship, belonging to the proa type (a main hulls and a massive, buoyant outrigger). Contrary to what Mendana wrote, the outrigger is always kept to windward. Its main differences from other proas are:

 The main hull (vaka) has an almost circular section whose submerged profile remains constant despite heeling, and has less almost no dry surface when trimmed for sailing. The design is meant to carry heavy loads.
 The vaka's top is very close to the flotation line, so it is closed with planks (tetau) and the accommodations for the crew are on an elevated platform over the Lakauhalava (the crossbeams connecting the main hull and the smaller, windward outrigger)
 The radical claw sail.

In common with a typical proa, it uses a radically long-armed form of crab claw sail. However, its particular variant, when a small, stiff model was evaluated in modern wind tunnel tests, shows superior performance over two of three points of sail.

W. C. O'Ferrall, an Anglican missionary to Melanesia between 1897 and 1904, described the tepukei as a "sailing canoe". He described it as consisting of a dugout log equipped with a deck upon which a small hut was built, powered by a "lofty and strikingly shaped sail", and steered with a long paddle. He reported that men from Santa Cruz used the boat to travel as far away as the Solomon Islands.

The Maunga Nefe, which may be the only te alolili that was built prior to 1970, is in the Ethnological Museum of Berlin. People of Outer Reef Islands (Vaeakau people) call them "Puki" making no distinction between tealolili and tepukei designs. It was brought by Dr. Gerd Koch from the Santa Cruz Islands in 1967.

In recent years, tepukei have been experiencing a renaissance. The Vaka Taumako Project has helped support the construction of these boats, and some vessels inspired by ancient designs are even being built in San Francisco.

External links

The Vaka Taumako Project
Account of tepukei construction
 3D model of a TePuke sailing canoe from Taumako.

References

Indigenous boats
Sailboat types
Multihulls
Outrigger canoes
Boat types